Alistair Fraser (January 5, 1923 – September 1, 1997) was the 8th Clerk of the House of Commons of Canada, having served from 1967 to 1979.

1923 births
1997 deaths
20th-century Canadian civil servants
Lawyers in British Columbia
Clerks of the House of Commons (Canada)
People from Toronto